Hamlet and the New Poetic is a book of literary criticism on James Joyce, T. S. Eliot and Hamlet by American professor William H. Quillian, originally published in 1983.

Overview
Hamlet and the New Poetic is an exploration of critical readings of Hamlet during the 19th and 20th centuries. During the Victorian era, Quillian argues, there was an "enormous and positive hold that Hamlet exerted on the literary imagination." This was followed by a "shift in perception" during the period of Modernism (c. 1911–1922) when T. S. Eliot and James Joyce condemned the play as a "failure." Jackson Bryer notes that this text includes an "informative reading" of Eliot's "Hamlet and His Problems" followed by "Eliot's changing attitudes towards this play in his later work."

Reviews
Cheng, Vincent John. "Review of William Quillian's Hamlet and the New Poetic: Joyce and Eliot." James Joyce Quarterly, 24, No. 1 (Fall 1986), 101–106.
Kidd, John. "The Genetic Joyce: A Retrospective Review," The James Joyce Literary Supplement 1.2 (Fall 1987): 11.

Notes

External links
 Hamlet and the New Poetic: James Joyce and T. S. Eliot. Ann Arbor, MI:UMI Research Press, 1983.

1983 non-fiction books
Books of literary criticism
Critical approaches to Hamlet
Works about James Joyce
T. S. Eliot
Modernism